Umar Kamani (born 21 March 1988) is an English fashion retailer and businessman. At 24, Kamani and his brother Adam co-founded a fashion firm and online retail company selling clothing, accessories and other items to women mainly aged between 12 and 25, "PrettyLittleThing.com."

Career

Boohoo.com 
In 2006, Kamani began working in the family business as a manager at Boohoo.com. In 2014, Boohoo debuted on the Alternative Investment Market with a market value of £560 million. This float was a major contribution to the Kamani family's wealth. In September 2016, analysts began speculating that Boohoo.com would acquire PrettyLittleThing after reviewing Boohoo's financials, which showed a 40% increase in turnover to £127.3 million for the half year which ended in August 2016.

PrettyLittleThing.com 
Brothers, Umar and Adam Kamani co-founded PrettyLittleThing.com in January 2012. By the middle of 2013, celebrities including Miley Cyrus, Michelle Keegan, Rita Ora, Jessie J, Ryan Thomas and Nicki Minaj had been seen wearing clothing from their rapidly growing fashion retailer. 66% of the company was acquired by Boohoo for £3.3 million in December 2016. The PrettyLittleThing.com team grew from 65 to 300 employees from 2014 to the end of 2015. This increase was to accommodate the workload influx from fulfilling 20 orders a day in 2014 to shipping 20,000 parcels a day by the middle of 2015. Additionally Umar reported a 500% increase in full-year sales to £30 million. In 2016, PrettyLittleThing opened their flagship USA location in Los Angeles, California. The launch party was hosted by Kylie Jenner.

References

Living people
1988 births
British businesspeople of Indian descent
British people of Gujarati descent
British retail company founders
Businesspeople from Manchester
Umar